The Fox Ministry was the second responsible government to be formed in New Zealand. It formed in 1856, but lasted less than a month, from 20 May to 2 June 1856. From the outset, William Fox served as Prime Minister as well as Attorney-General.

Background
Fox was the leader of a 'Wellington Party' of provincial supporters in opposition to the government of Henry Sewell during the 1856 session of Parliament. He moved resolutions which led to the Sewell Ministry's demise. Fox subsequently formed a new ministry at the Governor's invitation. His provincial policies were seen as too extreme for many members, particularly from Auckland. Fox remained much respected in Wellington though had few supporters elsewhere. His administration lasted only weeks and it was not long before he in turn was succeeded by a more centrist, long-lasting administration led by Edward Stafford, which governed until 1861.

Ministers
The following members served on the Fox Ministry:

Notes

References

See also
 Government of New Zealand

Ministries of Queen Victoria
Governments of New Zealand
19th century in New Zealand
1856 establishments in New Zealand
1856 disestablishments in New Zealand
Cabinets established in 1856
Cabinets disestablished in 1856